The Bibundi bat (Glauconycteris egeria) is a species of vesper bat in the family Vespertilionidae. It can be found in Cameroon, Republic of the Congo, Uganda, and the Dzanga-Sangha Special Reserve.

Taxonomy
It was described as a new species in 1913 by British zoologist Oldfield Thomas. The holotype had been collected in Bibundi, Cameroon by R. Kemp during the Rudd Exploration. Based on molecular evidence, it is closely related to the silvered bat (G. argentata).

Description
Its flight membranes are brown, and it has dusky brown fur. Its fur can also be dark brown or nearly black. It has very large ears, with fairly large tragi.

Range and habitat
The Bibundi bat is an African species, with documented occurrence in Cameroon, the Central African Republic, and Uganda. It is rarely encountered, with records from only six localities as of 2018.

Conservation
As of 2019, it is evaluated as a data deficient species by the IUCN because there is little is known about it.

References

Glauconycteris
Taxa named by Oldfield Thomas
Bats of Africa
Mammals described in 1913
Taxonomy articles created by Polbot